Anomiopus is a genus of scarab beetle in the subfamily Scarabaeinae.

Species

 Anomiopus ataenioides
 Anomiopus birai
 Anomiopus bonariensis
 Anomiopus caputipilus
 Anomiopus gracilis
 Anomiopus howdeni
 Anomiopus idei
 Anomiopus lacordairei
 Anomiopus laetus
 Anomiopus nigrocoeruleus
 Anomiopus parallelus
 Anomiopus pictus
 Anomiopus smaragdinus
 Anomiopus soledari
 Anomiopus virescens

References

 
Deltochilini